Axel Gerhardt Rosin (December 11, 1907 – March 27, 2007) was a philanthropist, president of the Book-of-the-Month Club and chairman emeritus of the Scherman Foundation.

Biography
Rosin was born in Berlin and graduated from Berlin University with a J.D. degree in 1930. He worked as a lawyer for the Supreme Court of Prussia until 1934, when he emigrated to the United States after the Nazis banned Jews from entering courthouses. He subsequently worked for a shoe manufacturer in Virginia. In 1943 he married Katharine Scherman, and was made comptroller of the Book-of-the-Month Club, which had been founded by Ms. Scherman's father Harry Scherman in 1926. His brother-in-law is conductor Thomas Scherman. Rosin became president of the company in 1960, a position he held until 1973, and was then chairman until his retirement in 1979. His decision in 1967 to pay $250,000 for the right to offer William Manchester's book, The Death of a President as a club selection helped to foster the company's resurgence. During Rosin's leadership the company's annual sales doubled and membership reached 1.25 million.

Overseeing the Scherman Foundation, Rosin was responsible for distributing grant monies to organizations promoting the arts, social welfare programs, the environment, disarmament, and reproductive rights.

He has two daughters with his wife, Karen Rosin Sollins and Susanna Rosin Bergtold.

Notes

References
Axel Rosin, 99, Longtime Head of the Book-of-the-Month Club, Dies The New York Times, March 28, 2007
Axel Gerhardt Rosin, 99; former president of Book-of-the-Month club, Los Angeles Times, March 29, 2007
Abel, Richard; Graham, William Gordon. The book in the United States today, 1997. Transaction Publishers

External links
Biography, The Scherman Foundation Inc.
Rosin in his office. Book Business, LIFE, 118, May 12, 1961

1907 births
2007 deaths
American people of German-Jewish descent
Jewish American philanthropists
20th-century American philanthropists
20th-century American Jews
21st-century American Jews
German emigrants to the United States